541132 Leleākūhonua, provisionally designated , is an extreme trans-Neptunian object and sednoid in the outermost part of the Solar System. It was first observed on 13 October 2015, by astronomers at the Mauna Kea Observatories, Hawaii. Based on its discovery date near Halloween and the letters in its provisional designation , the object was informally nicknamed "The Goblin" by its discoverers and later named Leleākūhonua, comparing its orbit to the flight of the Pacific golden plover.

Discovery 
Leleākūhonua was first observed on 13 October 2015 at the Mauna Kea Observatory , by American astronomers David Tholen, Chad Trujillo and Scott Sheppard during their astronomical survey for objects located beyond the Kuiper Cliff. The unofficial discovery was publicly announced on 1 October 2018. The survey uses two principal telescopes: For the Northern hemisphere, the 8.2-meter Subaru Telescope with its Hyper Suprime Camera at Mauna Kea Observatories, Hawaii, and for the Southern hemisphere, the 4-meter Blanco telescope and its Dark Energy Camera at Cerro Tololo Inter-American Observatory in Chile. For follow-up observations to determine an object's orbit, the astronomers are using the Magellan and the Discovery Channel telescopes.

Orbit and classification 

Leleākūhonua orbits the Sun at a distance of  once roughly every 32,000 years (semi-major axis of ~1080 AU).

Implications of orbit 
Along with the similar orbits of other distant trans-Neptunian objects, the orbit of Leleākūhonua suggests, but does not prove, the existence of a hypothetical Planet Nine in the outer Solar System.

, the object is inbound 78 AU from the Sun; about two-and-a-half times farther out than Pluto's current location. It will come to perihelion (closest approach to the Sun) in 2078. As with Sedna, it would not have been found had it not been on the inner leg of its long orbit. This suggests that there may be many similar objects, most too distant to be detected by contemporary technological methods. (A fraction the mass of Earth's moon but several times the mass of the asteroid belt.)

Numbering and naming 
In June 2020, it was formally  Leleākūhonua. The name was suggested by students in the Hawaiian-language program A Hua He Inoa. The object reminded students of the migrations of the kolea, or Pacific golden plover, which migrates from Alaska to Hawaii. The English description states that the name "compares the orbit to the flight of migratory birds and evokes a yearning to be near Earth" (in Hawaiian, me he manu i ke ala pōaiapuni lā, he paa mau nō ia i ka hui me kona pūnana i kumu mai ai – like a bird on a path circling the sun, it is forever seeking a leeward wind back toward home.)

Physical characteristics 

The size of Leleākūhonua depends on the assumed albedo (reflectivity); if it is a darker object then it would also have to be larger; a higher albedo would demand that it be smaller. The faint object has a visual magnitude of 24.64, comparable to the visual magnitudes of Pluto's smaller moons.

Visualizations

See also 
 List of Solar System objects most distant from the Sun
 List of Solar System objects by greatest aphelion
 V774104

References

External links 
 List Of Centaurs and Scattered-Disk Objects, Minor Planet Center
 
 

541132
541132
Discoveries by David J. Tholen
Discoveries by Chad Trujillo
Named minor planets
541132
20151013